Mohamed Josef Shirdel (born 3 April 1993) is a German Afghan professional footballer who plays for Dersimspor in the Landesliga Hamburg-Hansa and plays for the Afghanistan national football team.

International career
Shirdel was called up for Afghanistan for the 2015 SAFF Championship games but did not compete because of illness. He was again called up for the World Cup 2018 Qualifying games against Japan and Singapore. He appeared for Afghanistan in the World Cup qualifying game on 24 March 2016, which was won by Japan 5–0. Shirdel scored his first goal in his second match for Afghanistan against Singapore.

International goals

References

External links
 

1993 births
Living people
Afghan footballers
German footballers
Afghan expatriate footballers
German people of Afghan descent
Footballers from Hamburg
Afghanistan international footballers
Association football midfielders